Gravellona may refer to a pair of Italian municipalities:

Gravellona Lomellina, in the province of Pavia, Lombardy
Gravellona Toce, in the province of Verbano-Cusio-Ossola, Piedmont